Zero Dark Thirty is a 2012 American action thriller directed and co-produced by Kathryn Bigelow with screenplay by Mark Boal. The film was released in the United States on December 19, 2012, with a limited release at five theaters in Los Angeles and New York City. It made $124,848 in its limited release weekend, making it one of the biggest limited mid-week openings ever. As of March 6, 2013, Zero Dark Thirty has grossed a worldwide total of $106.8 million. Zero Dark Thirty also received a high critical acclaim, accumulating an approval rating of 93% on the review aggregator site Rotten Tomatoes.

Zero Dark Thirty earned various awards and nominations, with the nominations in categories ranging from recognition of the screenplay to its direction and editing to the cast's acting performance. It was nominated for five Academy Awards at the 85th Academy Awards, including Best Picture, Best Actress in a Leading Role, Best Original Screenplay, Best Film Editing, and won for Best Sound Editing (tied with Per Hallberg and Karen Baker Landers for Skyfall). It was also nominated for four Golden Globes at the 70th Golden Globe Awards, including Best Picture – Drama, Best Director, Best Screenplay, and won Best Actress – Drama for Jessica Chastain.

The Washington DC Area Film Critics award for Best Director was given to Kathryn Bigelow, the second time the honor has gone to a woman (the first also being Bigelow for The Hurt Locker). The film swept critics groups awards for Best Director and Best Picture including Washington DC, New York, Chicago and Boston film critics associations.

Awards and nominations

References

External links 
 

Zero Dark Thirty